was a Japanese voice actor. He played many supporting roles in television dramas. Kameyama was employed by the talent management firm Kiraboshi.

Death
Kameyama died aged 58. The cause of death is pneumonia.

Anime

TV
Anpanman (Ankora)
Highschool! Kimen-gumi (Honekishi Muzō)
Kimba the White Lion (3rd series) (Tony)
Konjiki no Gash Bell!! (Dr. Ichiro)
Pastel Yumi, the Magic Idol (Musutaki)
Magical Angel Creamy Mami (Hayato Kidokoro)
Mahōjin Guru Guru (Kasegi)
Maison Ikkoku (Asuna's father)
Midnight Horror School (Saraman-sensei)
Shura no Toki – Age of Chaos (Yagyū Munenori)
Ranpō (Karatarō)
Rurouni Kenshin (Detective Muraki)
Tokusō Kihei Dorvack (Pierre Bonaparte)
Zipang (Masanobu Tsuji)

OVA
Legend of the Galactic Heroes (Lao)

Movies
Laputa: Castle in the Sky (Henri)

Games
Brave Fencer Musashi (Harchinose)
Kingdom Hearts II (Winnie-the-Pooh)
Sly Cooper and The Thievius Raccoonus (Sir Raleigh) (PS2 Dub)
 Kingdom Hearts Birth by Sleep (Winnie-the-Pooh)

Tokusatsu
La Belle Fille Masquée Poitrine (Okawa-sensei)
Chōriki Sentai Ohranger  (Bara Skunk (ep. 36))
Gekisou Sentai Carranger  (UU Ussu (ep. 33))

Other voice over

Live-action dubbing
101 Dalmatians (2001 TV Asahi edition) (Horace (Mark Williams))
Red Dwarf (Kryten)

Animation
An Extremely Goofy Movie (P.J.)
Cats Don't Dance (T.W.)
Cinderella II: Dreams Come True (Gus)
Home on the Range (Lucky Jack)
Monsters, Inc. (Needlman)
Tugs (Hercules, the Coast Guard and the Shrimpers)
Winnie-the-Pooh (3rd series) (Pooh)

Commercials
MasterCard

References

External links
 Kiraboshi

1954 births
2013 deaths
People from Ishinomaki
Japanese male voice actors
Male voice actors from Miyagi Prefecture
20th-century Japanese male actors
21st-century Japanese male actors